Gian Luca Zattini (born 12 April 1955 in Meldola) is an Italian politician.

Zattini studied as MD and works as dentist; he was a member of the Christian Democracy (1980-1994) and served as member of municipal council (from 1975) and mayor of Meldola for two terms from 2009 to 2019.

He was elected Mayor of Forlì at the 2019 local elections with the civic list Forlì cambia (Forlì changes), supported by Northern League, The People of Family and a centre-right coalition. Zattini won the centre-left cohalition that had administered the city since sixty years. He took office on 11 June 2019.

In March 2020, he authorized the municipal police to use pilotless aircraft for monitoring citizens and for crime prevention. It has been one of the first Italian cases of use of drones at the service of a civil authority.

References

External links 
 
 
 

1955 births
Living people
Mayors of Forlì
Lega Nord politicians
Italian Freemasons